The Wayne County School District is a public school district based in Waynesboro, Mississippi (USA). The district's boundaries parallel that of Wayne County.

Schools
 Wayne County High School
 Waynesboro Middle School (Grades 5-8)
 Waynesboro Elementary School (Grades K-4)
 Beat Four Elementary School (Grades K-8)
 Buckatunna Elementary School (Grades K-8)
 Clara Elementary School (Grades K-8)

Demographics

2006-07 school year
There were a total of 3,896 students enrolled in the Wayne County School District during the 2006–2007 school year. The gender makeup of the district was 51% female and 49% male. The racial makeup of the district was 54.36% African American, 45.07% White, 0.23% Hispanic, 0.21% Asian, and 0.13% Native American. 65.5% of the district's students were eligible to receive free lunch.

Previous school years

Accountability statistics

See also
List of school districts in Mississippi

References

External links

Education in Wayne County, Mississippi
School districts in Mississippi